Mercan is a Turkish word meaning "coral". It is a Turkish given name for females as well as a surname, and may refer to:

Surname 
Faruk Mercan (born 1971), Turkish journalist and writer
Levent Mercan (born 2000), German footballer
Neşe Mercan (born 1994), Turkish female Paralympian goalball player

Pseudonym 
Mercan Dede (born 1966), Turkish composer, ney and bendir player (pseudonym for Arkın Ilıcalı)

Places
Mercan, Keşan

Turkish feminine given names
Turkish-language surnames

de:Mercan (Name)